Maxwell John Hayward (9 June 1915 – 21 February 2011) was an Australian rugby league footballer who played in the 1940s.

Originally from Beaudesert, Queensland, Max 'the mighty atom' Hayward was a half-back for the St George Dragons for three seasons: 1944, 1946 and 1947. Hayward enlisted in the Australian Army and served in the Middle East and New Guinea, thus his career was curtailed by World War II, but he re-signed with the club in 1946 and played in the 1946 Grand Final. 

After the 1947 season he played football on the N.S.W. North Coast before retiring.

References

St. George Dragons players
Australian rugby league players
1915 births
2011 deaths
Rugby league halfbacks
Rugby league players from Queensland
Australian Army personnel of World War II
Australian Army soldiers